Coldest city may refer to:

 The Coldest City (2012 comic), Cold War spy story graphic novel set in Berlin, Germany
 The Coldest City (film), former name of the 2017 film based on the eponymous comic, which was renamed to "Atomic Blonde" prior to release

Cities
 The coldest city, see List of weather records
 Yakutsk, Russia; coldest major city in winter
 Helsinki, Finland; coldest city to host the Summer Olympics

See also
 Pole of Cold
 City (disambiguation)
 Cold (disambiguation)